Gill Kalan is a village in Rampura, Tehsil in Bathinda District of Punjab State, India. It is located 38 km towards East from District headquarters Bathinda. 5 km from Rampura. 177 km from State capital Chandigarh.

The Gill Kalan Pin code is 151103 and postal head office is Rampura Phul.

Burj Mansa (1 km), Chotian (4 km), Bugran (4 km), Pitho (4 km), Jethuke (4 km) are the nearby villages to Gill Kalan. Gill Kalan is surrounded by Phul Tehsil towards the north, Nathana Tehsil towards the west, Sehna Tehsil towards the north, and Maur Tehsil towards the south.

Rampura Phul, Maur, Barnala, and Bathinda are the nearby cities to Gill Kalan.

Demographics
Punjabi is the local language here.

Transport
Rampura Bus Stand is the very nearby bus stand to Gill kalan.

By Rail
Jethuke Railway Station, Rampura Phul Railway Station are the very nearby railway stations to Gill Kalan. However, Bhatinda Jn Railway station is major railway station 38 km near to Gill Kalan.

Education

Nearby colleges

Mata Sundri Girls College Dhade
Address : Dikh Road
Jyoti B.ed. College
Address : Rampura Punjab

Schools
 PATH FINDER GLOBAL SCHOOL 
ADDRESS : RAMPURA GILL KALAN ROAD (CONTACT NO. 99880-23888)
Ghs Gill Kalan
Address : Gill Kalan, Rampura, Bathinda, Punjab. PIN- 151103, Post - Rampura Phul

Banks
Bank: State Bank of India

ATM
ATM: State Bank of India

 Address: VPO Gill Kalan, Dist Bhatinda
 State: Punjab
 District: Bathinda
 Branch: Gill Kalan
 Contact: 01651-234043
 IFSC Code: SBIN0010750 (used for RTGS, IMPS and NEFT transactions)
 Branch Code: Last six characters of IFSC Code represent Branch code.
 MICR Code: 151002171

Religion
Gurudwara Shri Patshahi Chevin Sahib

Related to:-
Sri Guru Hargobind Sahib Ji

Address
  Village Gilla Kalan
  District :- Bathinda
  State :- Punjab.
  Phone Number :-

Gill Kalan Data

References

Villages in Bathinda district